"Rent" is a song by English synth-pop duo Pet Shop Boys from their second studio album, Actually (1987). It was released as the album's third single on 12 October 1987.

Song information
The lyric is commonly thought to deal with a financially one-sided relationship, i.e. that of a kept man, the title implying more specifically the lot of a rent boy. Neil Tennant, however, stated in the Actually: Further Listening liner notes:

It peaked at number 8 in the British charts. Producer Stephen Hague remixed the song for single release.

Video
The video for the song was directed by Derek Jarman. It features two intercut storylines. One, filmed in black and white, shows Chris Lowe arriving at King's Cross station by train and walking past various low-life characters. The other, filmed in colour, features Margi Clarke as the partner of a wealthy man (played by Alexander Thynn, 7th Marquess of Bath), who is hosting a dinner party. The lyrics are sung by Tennant, who plays her chauffeur. The woman becomes annoyed when the man pays her no attention.  She then gets Tennant to drive her to King's Cross. There, she meets Lowe on the platform and they embrace.

Track listing
 7": Parlophone / R 6168 (UK)
 "Rent" – 3:35
 "I Want a Dog" – 4:57

 12": Parlophone / 12R 6168 (UK)
 "Rent" (Extended Mix) – 7:06
 "Rent" (Dub) – 6:06
 "I Want a Dog" – 4:57

 also available on CD (Parlophone / CD R 6168)

Charts

References

1987 singles
1987 songs
Liza Minnelli songs
Parlophone singles
Pet Shop Boys songs
Song recordings produced by Julian Mendelsohn
Songs written by Chris Lowe
Songs written by Neil Tennant